Heribert Prantl (born 30 July 1953 in Nittenau, Bavaria, Germany) is a German author, journalist and jurist (former judge, prosecutor and lawyer). 
At the Süddeutsche Zeitung he was head of the department of domestic policy from 1995 to 2017, head of the department "opinion" from 2018 to 2019, member of the chief editors from 2011 to 2019 and is now columnist and author. Since 2002 he has been a lecturer at the faculty of law at Bielefeld University, where he was appointed honorary professor in 2010. He wrote various political books.

Early life and family
Prantl was born in Nittenau in Bavaria on 30 July 1953. A stipendiary of the Catholic "Cusanuswerk", he studied law, philosophy and history at the University of Regensburg and earned his juris doctor. Afterwards he studied journalism and worked as a judge as well as a public prosecutor.

Prantl lives together with journalist Franziska Augstein.

Work as a journalist
In 1988, Prantl started working for the Süddeutsche Zeitung (SZ) in the department for domestic policy with focus on legal policy. In 1992 he was promoted to deputy head of the department and 1995 he became the head of the department. As of March 1, 2019 he stepped down from duties as head of the opinion department and as a member of the editorial board. He continues to work at the SZ as a writer and columnist, writing a weekly column on political and societal issues under the headline Prantls Blick for the paper's weekend edition.

Considered a social liberal by many, Prantl has achieved a reputation of being a defender of a liberal and cosmopolitan society that respects the basic rights of all people.

Other work

Apart from his work as a journalist, Prantl is a critically acclaimed author of political commentary, especially concerning basic liberties and the rule of law. He also appears often on ARD radio stations as a commentator for current domestic affairs.

Prantl is also a lecturer for journalism at the Akademie für Publizistik in Hamburg and at the Institut zur Förderung publizistischen Nachwuchses in Munich as well as a member of the PEN center of Germany. Since 2002 he is lecturer for law at the University of Bielefeld and since 2004 he is on the advisory board of "Pro Justitia". 

In addition, Prantl hold the following honorary positions:
 Deutsche Nationalstiftung, Member of the Senate
 UNICEF National Committee of Germany, Member
 European Law Students' Association (ELSA) – Germany Chapter, Member of the Advisory Board
 Reporters Without Borders Germany, Member of the Board of Trustees
 Rotary International, Member

Awards
 1983: Science award of the University of Regensburg and the House of Thurn und Taxis for studies in law and economics
 1989: Editorial award of the journalistic foundation Der Tagesspiegel
 1992: Journalism award of the Deutscher Anwaltverein (German lawyers' association)
 1994: Geschwister-Scholl-Preis for his book Deutschland, leicht entflammbar
 1996: Kurt-Tucholsky-Preis for journalism
 1999: Siebenpfeiffer-Preis for freedom and democratic rights
 2001: Theodor Wolff Prize in the category "Essay" for his comment "Lob der Provinz" (Süddeutsche Zeitung, 1 April 2000)
 2004: Rhetoric award for the "speech of the year" by the University of Tübingen
 2006: Erich-Fromm-Preis (together with Hans Leyendecker)
 2006: Arnold-Freymuth-Preis
 2007: Roman-Herzog-Medienpreis
 2008: Goldener Prometheus for political journalism, awarded by the magazine V.i.S.d.P.
 2008: Puk-Preis for cultural journalism, awarded by the Deutscher Kulturrat
 2008: Ketteler-Preis of the foundation 'Zukunft der Arbeit und der sozialen Sicherung' (ZASS)
 2009: Justice medal of Bavaria
 2010: Cicero-Rednerpreis (orator's award)
 2012: Brothers Grimm Prize of the University of Marburg

Bibliography
 Die journalistische Information zwischen Ausschlußrecht und Gemeinfreiheit. Eine Studie zum sogenannten Nachrichtenschutz, zum mittelbaren Schutz der journalistischen Information durch § 1 UWG und zum Exklusivvertrag über journalistische Informationen. Verlag E.u.W. Gieseking, Bielefeld 1983, 
 Deutschland – leicht entflammbar. Ermittlungen gegen die Bonner Politik. Carl Hanser Verlag, München/Wien 1994, 
 Heribert Prantl: The Justice administration in the cage of politics. What would happen if Italian Public prosecutors investigated German politicians? in: European legal cultures. Dartmouth Publishing, Aldershot; Brookfield 1996, page 358, 
 Heribert Prantl [Hg.]: Wehrmachtsverbrechen. Eine deutsche Kontroverse. Hoffmann und Campe Verlag, Hamburg 1997, 
 Sind wir noch zu retten? Anstiftung zum Widerstand gegen eine gefährliche Politik. Carl Hanser Verlag, München/Wien 1998, 
 Rot-Grün – Eine erste Bilanz. Hoffmann und Campe Verlag, Hamburg 1999,  
 Hans Leyendecker, Heribert Prantl, Michael Stiller: Helmut Kohl, die Macht und das Geld. Steidl Verlag, Göttingen 2000,  
 Heribert Prantl, Thomas Vormbaum [pub.]: Juristisches Zeitgeschehen 2000 in der Süddeutschen Zeitung. Nomos Verlagsgesellschaft, Baden-Baden 2001, 
 Arthur Kaufmann/Heribert Prantl, Was der Mensch dem Menschen schuldet. Carl Heymanns Verlag, Köln/Berlin/Bonn/München, Sonderdruck 2001
 Heribert Prantl: Battle Without Borders: The War Against Terror – Infinite Punishment. World Press Review, Vol. 48 No. 12, 2001, p. 10.
 Verdächtig – Der starke Staat und die Politik der inneren Unsicherheit. Europa Verlag, Hamburg 2002, 
 Heribert Prantl, Thomas Vormbaum [pub.]: Juristisches Zeitgeschehen 2001 in der Süddeutschen Zeitung. Nomos Verlagsgesellschaft, Baden-Baden 2002, 
 Heribert Prantl, Thomas Vormbaum [pub.]: Juristisches Zeitgeschehen 2002 in der Süddeutschen Zeitung. Berliner Wissenschafts-Verlag, Berlin 2003, 
 Heribert Prantl, Thomas Vormbaum [pub.]: Juristisches Zeitgeschehen 2003 in der Süddeutschen Zeitung. Berliner Wissenschafts-Verlag, Berlin 2004, 
 Heribert Prantl, Thomas Vormbaum [pub.]: Juristisches Zeitgeschehen 2004 in der Süddeutschen Zeitung. Berliner Wissenschafts-Verlag, Berlin 2005, 
 Heribert Prantl: Kein schöner Land – Die Zerstörung der sozialen Gerechtigkeit. Droemer Verlag, München 2005, 
 Heribert Prantl im Gespräch mit Hans-Jochen Vogel: Politik und Anstand. Warum wir ohne Werte nicht leben können. Herder Verlag, Freiburg/Basel/Wien 2005, 
 Heribert Prantl, Nina von Hardenberg [pub.]: Schwarz Rot Grau. Altern in Deutschland. München 2008, 
 Der Terrorist als Gesetzgeber. Wie man mit Angst Politik macht. Droemer/Knaur 2008, 
 Heribert Prantl, Robert Probst: Einigkeit und Recht und Wohlstand: Wie Deutschland wurde, was es ist. 60 Jahre Bundesrepublik Süddeutsche Zeitung/Bibliothek; Juli 2009, 
 Heribert Prantl:Der Zorn Gottes – Denkanstöße zu den Feiertagen. Süddeutsche Zeitung Edition, München 2011, 
 Heribert Prantl:Wir sind viele: Eine Anklage gegen den Finanzkapitalismus. Süddeutsche Zeitung Edition, München 2011, 
 Heribert Prantl:Alt.Amen.Anfang. – Neue Denkanstöße. Süddeutsche Zeitung Edition, München 2013, 
 Heribert Prantl:Glanz und Elend der Grundrechte. Zwölf Sterne für das Grundgesetz. Droemer, München 2014, 
 Heribert Prantl:Im Namen der Menschlichkeit – Rettet die Flüchtlinge. Ullstein, Berlin 2015, 
 Heribert Prantl: Trotz alledem! Europa muss man einfach lieben. Suhrkamp Verlag, Berlin 2016, 
 Heribert Prantl:Was ein einzelner vermag. Politische Zeitgeschichten. Süddeutsche Zeitung Edition, München 2016, 
 Heribert Prantl:Gebrauchsanweisung für Populisten. Wie man dem neuen Extremismus das Wasser abgräbt. Ecowin, Salzburg 2017, 
 Heribert Prantl:Die Kraft der Hoffnung. Denkanstöße in schwierigen Zeiten. Süddeutsche Zeitung Edition, München 2017, 
 Heribert Prantl:Eigentum verpflichtet. Das unerfüllte Grundgesetz. Süddeutsche Zeitung Edition, München 2019, 
 Heribert Prantl:Not und Gebot. Grundrechte in Quarantäne. C. H. Beck, München 2021,

References

External links

1953 births
German journalists
German male journalists
German newspaper journalists
20th-century German journalists	
21st-century German journalists
Jurists from Bavaria
Living people
Academic staff of Bielefeld University
German male writers
Süddeutsche Zeitung people
People from Schwandorf (district)